These are tables of congressional delegations from Tennessee to the United States House of Representatives and the United States Senate.

The current dean of the Tennessee delegation is Senator Marsha Blackburn, having served in Congress continuously since 2003. Blackburn served in the House until 2019, when she assumed her seat in the Senate that she won in 2018.

U.S. House of Representatives

Current members 
List of current members United States House from Tennessee, their terms in office, district boundaries, and the district political ratings according to the CPVI. The delegation has 9 members: 8 Republicans and 1 Democrat.

1789–1791: part of North Carolina 
He continued to serve after the entirety of his district was ceded to the federal government and formed the Southwest Territory.

1793–1796: 1 non-voting delegate

1796–1803: 1 seat 
From achieving statehood on December 4, 1796, until 1803, Tennessee elected one representative, at-large, statewide.

1803–1813: 3 seats 
Tennessee elected three representatives, at-large, statewide for the 8th Congress, and then in separate districts after that.

1813–1823: 6 seats 
Tennessee elected six representatives from districts.

1823–1833: 9 seats 
From 1823 to 1833, Tennessee elected nine representatives.

1833–1843: 13 seats 
For the ten years following the 1830 census, Tennessee had its largest apportionment of 13 seats.

1843–1853: 11 seats 
After the 1840 census, Tennessee lost 2 seats.

1853–1863: 10 seats 
After the 1850 census, Tennessee lost 1 seat.

1863–1873: 8 seats 
After the 1860 census, Tennessee lost 2 seats.

1873–1933: 10 seats 
After the 1870 census, Tennessee gained 2 seats.

1933–1943: 9 seats 
After the 1930 census, Tennessee lost 1 seat.

1943–1953: 10 seats 
After the 1940 census, Tennessee gained 1 seat.

1953–1973: 9 seats 
After the 1950 census, Tennessee lost 1 seat.

1973–1983: 8 seats 
After the 1970 census, Tennessee lost 1 seat.

1983–present: 9 seats 
After the 1980 census, Tennessee gained 1 seat.

United States Senate

Key

See also

List of United States congressional districts
Tennessee's congressional districts
Political party strength in Tennessee

Notes

References 

 
 
Tennessee
Politics of Tennessee
Congressional delegations